Highs in the Mid-Sixties, Volume 15 (subtitled Wisconsin, Part 2) is a compilation album in the Highs in the Mid-Sixties series, featuring recordings that were released in Wisconsin.  An earlier volume in the series, Highs in the Mid-Sixties, Volume 10 also features bands from this state.

Release data
This album was released in 1985 as an LP by AIP Records (as #AIP-10025).

Notes on the tracks
The psychedelic instrumental tribute to Jefferson Airplane by The Challengers is among the clever songs on this album.

Track listing

Side 1

 The Baroques: "There's Nothing Left to Do But Cry" (Jay Borkenhagen) - rel. 1967
 The Shaprels: "A Fool for Your Lies" (The Shaprels)
 Gord's Horde: "I Don't Care" (D. Nordall)
 The Cannons: "Days Go By" (The Cannons)
 Family: "I Wanna Do It"
 The Wanderer's Rest: "You'll Forget" (Diamond)
 The Challengers: "Take a Ride on the Jefferson Airplane" (Mike Houlihan)

Side 2
 The Mustard Men: "I Lost My Baby" (Warren P. Wiegratz)
 The Spacemen: "Same Old Grind" (Skaare/Fondow)
 The Impalas: "Spoonful" (Willie Dixon)
 The Mid-Knighters: "Charlena" (M. Chavez/H. Chaney)
 Joey Gee & the Come-Ons: "You Know – 'Til the End of Time" (Joey Gee & the Come-Ons)
 Bill Allan & the Fugitives: "Come on and Clap" (Bill Allan)
 The Medallions: "Leave Me Alone" (Ralph Mullin)
 The Rehabilitation Cruise: "Mini Skirts"

Pebbles (series) albums
1985 compilation albums
Music of Wisconsin